BV Bhaskar is an actor who appears in Bollywood (Hindi movies) and Sandalwood (Kannada movies). He got a break in mainstream cinema and debuted in a Sandalwood Movie, Veeraparampare, directed by S. Narayan. He also contributed himself as a cricketer. He has made up to Ranji Trophy and has played for County Championship English County Cricket League and is a Star player of the Celebrity Premier League for Karnataka Bulldozers.

Life history
Bhaskar was born in Mysore to Sri. K S Venkata Raju and Smt. Jayalakshmi and was brought up in Bangalore. Graduated from Acharya Patashala College, Bengaluru, Karnataka. He set foot into the game of cricket through the inspiration of his father, who served as a scientist at DRDO Defence Research and Development Organisation under the supervision of Dr. APJ Abdul Kalam.

Film career
In 2006, Bhaskar accepted a role as a theatre actor and got an offer to play in Mane Mane Kathe at the iconic Ravindra Theater. After that, he got an opportunity to act in more than 20 plays and perform as a linguistically holistic actor in Urdu, Hindi and English languages. In the year of 2008, he got an opportunity to act in mainstream cinema and debuted in the Kannada movie Veera Parampare. Apart from Veera Parampare, he also acted in many Sandalwood movies like Warewaha, Munjanne, Ondu Kshanadalli, Aane Pataaki and Kempiruve. He also acted in small roles in a few Bollywood movies, including MS Dhoni and Naam Shabana.

Cricketing career
Bhaskar proved his talent not only in the sandalwood industry but also in cricket and done notable achievements. He started his cricketing career when he was in school days. He made cricket as his passion played minor county cricket and selected in the Ranji squad of Karnataka. He properly managed both his studies and passion for cricket. During his college days, he represented Bangalore University as a cricketer and later secured a job in a bank due to his contributions to the cricketing circle. He played for the state senior under 25, because of his consistency and passion towards cricket when working. He played for Karnataka and scored 177 runs against Hyderabad and got a huge support for the local team. He maintained a perfect balance between academics and sports, and later on with career and sports. He was a part of the ‘Celebrity Premier League’ and played for Karnataka bulldozers. He scored 20 runs off the last over against Chennai rhinos in CCL match    "1 BALL:  8 RUNS yes impossible but our Blastic Bhaskar did it in the match against Chennai in CCL 4. He hit last ball six which was no ball and turned the match upside down. He wrote the history in CCL matches which no one could beat in CCL till date" Media went Gaga on his achievement. He led the team to victory which will remain as the part of the audiences, forever.

References

Bhaskar Karbonn Kamal Catch CCL
Karnataka Bulldozers VsTelugu Warriors CCL T20 match

External links
BV Bhaskar About
About Bhaskar
https://www.filmibeat.com/celebs/b-v-bhaskar/biography.html
 Cricketer

Male actors from Bangalore
21st-century Indian male actors
Kannada people
Year of birth missing (living people)
Living people
Actors from Mysore